National Route 229 is a national highway of Japan connecting Otaru, Hokkaido and Esashi, Hokkaido in Japan, with a total length of 307 km (190.76 mi).

References

National highways in Japan
Roads in Hokkaido